Martin Schurig (1656–1733) was the first physician to occupy himself with the anatomy of the sexual organs. 

Based in Dresden, Schurig is known for his Spermatologia Historico-Medica, often known simply as Spermatologia, published in Latin in 1720. Havelock Ellis quotes freely from his works.

Books
 Schurig, M. Spermatologia historico-medica. Johannis Beckii, Frankfort, 1720.
 Schurig, M. Gynaecologia Historico-Medica. Office Hekeliana, 1730.
 Schurig, M. Muliebria historico-medica. C. Hekel, 1729.

Notes

1656 births
1733 deaths
17th-century German physicians
18th-century German physicians
German sexologists
17th-century German writers
17th-century German male writers
18th-century German writers
18th-century German male writers